WDAR-FM (105.5 FM), known as "105.5 The Beat", is an urban contemporary formatted radio station licensed to Darlington, South Carolina, and serving the Florence, South Carolina area.  It is owned by iHeartMedia, Inc.  Its studios are in Florence, and its transmitter is in Darlington.

History
Prior to 1990, this station was adult contemporary/oldies. Then it was a classic rock station. It was also a country music radio station known as "Gator 105.5". For many years WDAR-FM played adult contemporary music as Sunny 105.5.

In a deal announced in February 1997, Root Communications Ltd. announced plans to buy eight radio stations owned by Florence-based Atlantic Broadcasting, including WDAR-FM. Qantum Communications Inc. purchased Florence's Root Communications Group LP stations in 2003.

The change to contemporary Christian took place in September 2013.

On May 15, 2014, Qantum Communications announced that it would sell its 29 stations, including WDAR-FM, to Clear Channel Communications (now iHeartMedia), in a transaction connected to Clear Channel's sale of WALK AM-FM in Patchogue, New York to Connoisseur Media via Qantum. The transaction was consummated on September 9, 2014.

On August 21, 2017, WDAR-FM changed their format to urban contemporary, branded as "105.5 The Beat".

References

External links
WDAR-FM official website

DAR-FM
IHeartMedia radio stations
Urban contemporary radio stations in the United States